The Mitchigan River is a  stream in the Upper Peninsula of the U.S. state of Michigan. The Fence River is a tributary of the Michigamme River, which is itself a tributary to the Menominee River, flowing to Lake Michigan. It flows mostly southward along the boundary between Iron and Marquette counties, crossing briefly into western Marquette County.

Named tributaries from the mouth include:
Outflow from Little Chief Lake in Marquette County
Outflow from Chief Lake in Marquette County
Outflow from Springhole Lake in Marquette County
Outflow from Bullhead Lake in Marquette County
Leonard Creek, which rises in northeast Iron County at

References

Rivers of Michigan
Rivers of Iron County, Michigan
Rivers of Baraga County, Michigan
Rivers of Marquette County, Michigan
Tributaries of Lake Michigan